John Pontifex may refer to:
 John Pontifex (cricketer, born 1796)
 John Pontifex (cricketer, born 1771)